Noël Séka (born 3 September 1984) is a Beninese former professional footballer who played as a central defender.

Career
Born in Allahe, Benin, Séka played club football for Requins, US Créteil-Lusitanos, FC Fyn and Al-Nasr.

He earned 12 caps for the Benin national team.

References

1984 births
Living people
People from Allahé
Association football defenders
Beninese footballers
Benin international footballers
Requins de l'Atlantique FC players
US Créteil-Lusitanos players
FC Fyn players
Al-Nasr SC (Salalah) players
Ligue 2 players
Danish 2nd Division players
2008 Africa Cup of Nations players
Beninese expatriate footballers
Beninese expatriate sportspeople in France
Expatriate footballers in France
Beninese expatriate sportspeople in Denmark
Expatriate men's footballers in Denmark
Beninese expatriate sportspeople in Oman
Expatriate footballers in Oman